WTC View is an American film released in 2005, based on the 2003 play of the same name by Brian Sloan, that traces the search for a roommate in the weeks following the September 11 attacks. Eric (Michael Urie), a gay photographer, places an ad for a new roommate on September 10, 2001 for his apartment with a view of the World Trade Center. He encounters prospective roommates in varying stages of grief, including a campaign worker for mayoral candidate Mark J. Green, a boisterous construction worker, an idealistic NYU student, and a trader on Wall Street, each of whom share his own perspective on the events. Throughout the film, Eric deals with the aftermath of 9/11, the trauma it has caused and continues to cause him, and the resulting split from his boyfriend.

Cast 
 Michael Urie as Eric
 Jeremy Beazlie as Jeremy
 Lucas Papaelias as Kevin
 Elizabeth Kapplow as Josie
 Michael Linstroth as Jeff
 Nick Potenzieri as Alex
 Jay Gillespie as Max
 Stephen Sporer as Conor (voice)
 Jeff Wenger as Ben (voice)
 Bob Williams as Will (voice)
 M. Rosenthal as Victor (voice)
 Charles Couineau as Charles (voice)
 Tim Allis as Matt (voice)
 Jace Mclean as Ted (voice)
 Kevin Ray as Joey (voice)
 Pete Zias as Yval (voice)
 Julian Fleisher as Roommate Reject (voice) (billed as Julian Fleischer)
 Eric Sanders as Roommate Reject (voice)
 John Keating as Roommate Reject (voice)
 Brandon Taylor as Roommate Reject (voice)
 Mark Sam as Roommate Reject (voice)
 David Zellnik as Roommate Reject (voice)

External links
 
 

2005 films
American LGBT-related films
Films based on the September 11 attacks
New York City in fiction
2005 drama films
LGBT-related drama films
2005 LGBT-related films
American films based on plays
2000s English-language films
2000s American films